Downstream may refer to:
 Downstream (hydrology)
 Downstream (bioprocess)
 Downstream (manufacturing)
 Downstream (networking)
 Downstream (software development)
 Downstream (petroleum industry)
 Upstream and downstream (DNA), determining relative positions on DNA
 Upstream and downstream (transduction), determining temporal and mechanistic order of cellular and molecular events of signal transduction

In entertainment
 Downstream (novella), a novella by Joris-Karl Huysmans
 Downstream (1929 film), a British film by Giuseppe Guarino
 Downstream (2010 film), an action science fiction film
 "Downstream" (Land of the Lost), an episode of the 1974 series '"Land of the lost"
 Downstream (album), an album by New Monsoon
 "Downstream", a song by Supertramp from Even in the Quietest Moments
 "Downstream", a song by American Head Charge from The Feeding
 "Downstream", a track written by Shira Kammen that was part of the Braid soundtrack

See also
Upstream (disambiguation)